Wankaner is one of the 182 Legislative Assembly constituencies of Gujarat state in India. It is part of Morbi district and a segment of Rajkot Lok Sabha constituency.

List of segments
This assembly seat represents the following segments

 Wankaner Taluka
 Rajkot Taluka (Part) Villages – Jaliya, Ratanpar, Khorana, Sanosara, Rampara (Suliya), Vankvad, Hirasar, Satda, Jhiyana, Khijadiya, Nagalpar, Rajgadh, Gavaridad, Para Pipaliya, Hadmatiya (Bedi), Nakaravadi, Pipaliya, Ranpar, Kuchiyadad, Rampara Beti, Parevala, Saypar, Kuvadva, Dhamalpar, Sokhada, Ronki, Ghanteshvar, Vajdi Gadh, Vejagam, Maliyasan, Targhadiya, Gunda, Magharvada, Mesvada, Barvan, Chanchadiya, Jamgadh, Rafala, Kherdi, Amargadh, Thorala, Mahika, Thebachda, Gadhka, Bedla, Fadadang, Deroi, Manharpur, Bedi, Madhapar, Anandpar

Members of Legislative Assembly

Election results

2022

2017

2012

1972
 Abdulmutallib K Pirzada (Congress) : 19,614 votes
 Keshubhai Patel (BJS) : 10,047

See also
 List of constituencies of the Gujarat Legislative Assembly
 Morbi district

References

External links
 

Assembly constituencies of Gujarat
Morbi district
Year of establishment missing